Big Hole is a settlement in Northumberland County, New Brunswick. It is located 5.56 km south of Sevogle.

History
In 1871, Big Hole had a population of 50.

Notable people

See also
List of communities in New Brunswick

References

Communities in Northumberland County, New Brunswick